Dave Franklin (September 28, 1895 – February 2, 1970) was an accomplished American songwriter and pianist. A member of Tin Pan Alley, Franklin co-wrote "The Merry-Go-Round Broke Down", which was adopted as the theme song to the Looney Tunes cartoon series. His primary collaborator was lyricist Cliff Friend. His other collaborators included Al Dubin, Isham Jones, Irving Taylor. Franklin worked in vaudeville and night clubs in the U.S. and Europe. According to The Complete Encyclopedia of Popular Music and Jazz, 1900–1950, by Roger Kinkle, he left school at 13 to work as a pianist in a publishing house. Some of his songs were recorded by Glen Gray, Isham Jones, Guy Lombardo and Frankie Trumbauer.

Shows and films
Paramount on Parade
That's Right—You're Wrong

Songs

Unknown date
Cincinnati Rag
If I Had a Magic Carpet
Rhythm of the Tambourine (in 1929 Broadway Scandals)

1930 
I'm Isidore the Toreador

1934
Blue Lament
I Ain't Lazy, I'm Just Dreaming
It's Funny to Everyone But Me

1935
Give a Broken Heart a Break
I Woke Up Too Soon

1936
Breakin' in a New Pair of Shoes
I Hope Gabriel Likes My Music
When My Dreamboat Comes Home

1937
Everything You Said Came True
Never Should Have Told You
The Merry-Go-Round Broke Down
Two Dreams Got Together
You Can't Stop Me From Dreaming

1938
I Come From a Musical Family
I Must See Annie Tonight
There's a Brand New Picture in My Picture Frame
Who Do You Think I Saw Last Night?

1939
Happy Birthday to Love
I'm Building a Sailboat of Dreams
The Concert in the Park
You Don't Know How Much You Can Suffer

1941
El vals del aniversario

1942
The Penny Arcade

1943
It's Like Old Times

1944
By The Old Corral

1945
Lily Belle

1946
One-zy Two-zy

1947
Dreamer's Holiday
Lone Star Moon

1949
California Orange Blossom
The Golden Sands of Hawaii

1950
A Good Time Was Had By All
A Man Wrote a Song
You Are My Love

1954
Still You'd Break My Heart

1958
The Voice in My Heart

Audio recordings of songs

1956– John Serry Sr. recorded When My Dreamboat Comes Home for Dot Records (See Squeeze Play (album))

1956 Fats Domino recorded When My Dreamboat Comes Home for Imperial Records (See Fats Domino Rock and Rollin')

1965 Fats Domino re-recorded When My Dreamboat Comes Home for ABC-Paramount Records

References

External links
 

1895 births
1970 deaths
20th-century American composers
20th-century American male musicians
American male composers
Musicians from New York City
Songwriters from New York (state)
American male songwriters